Johnson C. Smith University (JCSU) is a private historically black university in Charlotte, North Carolina. It is affiliated with the Presbyterian Church (USA) and accredited by the Southern Association of Colleges and Schools (SACS). The university awards Bachelor of Science, Bachelor of Arts, Bachelor of Social Work, and Master of Social Work degrees.

History

Johnson C. Smith University was established on April 7, 1867, as the Biddle Memorial Institute at a meeting of the Catawba Presbytery in the old Charlotte Presbyterian Church. Mary D. Biddle, a churchwoman, donated $1,400 to the school. In appreciation of this first contribution, friends requested that Mrs. Biddle name the newly established school; she did so in the name of her late husband, Captain Henry Jonathan Biddle, who had been mortally wounded during the Battle of Glendale in 1862. Samuel C. Alexander and Willis L. Miller saw the need for a school in the south, and after the birth of the school they were elected as some of the first teachers. Its corresponding women's school was Scotia Seminary (now Barber-Scotia College).

In 1876, the charter was changed by the legislature of the State of North Carolina and the name became Biddle University, under which name the institution operated until 1923.

In 1891, Biddle University elected Daniel J. Sanders as the first African-American as president of a four-year institution in the south.

From 1921 to 1922, Jane Berry Smith donated funds to build a theological dormitory, a science hall, a teachers' cottage, and a memorial gate. She also provided an endowment for the institution in memory of her late husband, Johnson C. Smith. Up until her death, she donated funds for five more buildings and a campus church. In recognition of these generous benefactions, the Board of Trustees voted to change the name of the institution to Johnson C. Smith University. The charter of the school, accordingly, was amended on March 1, 1923, by the legislature of the State of North Carolina.

In 1924, James B. Duke established the Duke Endowment. While the largest share of that the endowment's earnings are allocated to support Duke University, Duke's donation required that 4% of its earnings be given to the university. Over the years, this share of the Endowment's distributions has exceeded $90 million.

In 1932, the university's charter was amended, providing for the admission of women. The 65-year-old institution for men then became partially coeducational. The first residence hall for women, named in memory of James B. Duke, was dedicated in 1940. In 1941, women were admitted to the freshman class. In 1942, the university was a fully coeducational institution.

JCSU joined the United Negro College Fund in 1944 as a founding member. This fund was organized primarily to help church-related schools of higher learning to revamp their training programs, to expand their physical plants, to promote faculty growth and to create new areas of service.

Biddle Memorial Hall is on the National Register of Historic Places.

Timeline
1867: The Henry J. Biddle Memorial Institute was founded by the Reverends Samuel C. Alexander and Willis L. Miller. Mary D. Biddle, an excellent churchwoman of Philadelphia, Pennsylvania, who, through appeals in one of the church papers, pledged $1,400 to the school. In appreciation of this first and generous contribution, friends requested that Biddle name the newly established school after her late husband, Major Henry Biddle. 
1867: The first class sessions were held in May in "Audience Chamber" of Seventh Street Presbyterian Church, then located in a section called "Log Town."
1869: Biddle Institute officially opens on the present site in September
1869: The first president, the Reverend Stephen Mattoon was elected on October 9, 1869
1871: The first class, made up of three students, graduated from the Seminary. Those students were B. F. McDowell, Calvin McCurdey, Eli Walker. 
1876: Biddle Institute changes its name to Biddle University. 
1883: The Administration Building was erected.
1884:  The Reverend William A. Holliday is elected as the second president of the university. 
1885: The Reverend Stephen Mattoon returns to serve again, this time as interim president. 
1886: The Reverend William F. Johnson is elected as the third President of the university. 
1891: Dr. Daniel J. Sanders is the first African-American elected as the president of the university. 
1892: Biddle University competes in the first intercollegiate football game between two historically Black colleges, winning against Livingstone College. 
1894: Biddle University holds its Quatro-Centennial Celebration. 
1895: Carter Hall, the first substantial dormitory, was erected.  The dormitory was named in after Miss Mary A. Carter of Geneva, NY in honor of the donation she provided for its construction. 
1895: “The Gold and Blue” are named the official school colors, making their debut on Easter. 
1905: The first student newspaper, The Argus, begins publication. 
1907: Dr. Henry Lawrence McCrorey is elected president upon the death of President Daniel J. Sanders. 
1911: Carnegie Library was erected with the aid of funding from the Carnegie Fund. 
1917: Biddle University celebrates its Fiftieth Anniversary. 
1917:  of land are generously donated to the university, a donation from the daughters of the Reverend Stephen Mattoon.
1921: After the death of her husband, Johnson C. Smith (Crayne) (August 20, 1919), Mrs. Jane Berry Smith is interested in identifying worthwhile causes to donate to that would be of the most benefit.  She becomes interested in Biddle University through her association with Dr. McCrorey and begins her benefactions to the university. 
1921: The first Greek letter organization is established.  The Rho chapter of Omega Psi Phi fraternity was chartered on November 7, 1921. 
1922: The Science Hall and Johnson C. Smith Theological Dormitory are erected. 
1923: Biddle University in renamed Johnson C. Smith University by the board of trustees and the Division of Missions for Colored people in honor of the concerns and contributions of Mrs. Jane Berry Smith.  The Charter of the university was amended on March 1, 1923, to legalize the name change.  To keep the memory of Major Henry J. Biddle alive, the Administration Building was renamed “Biddle Memorial Hall”. 
1923: Alpha Phi Alpha fraternity is established on campus.  The Alpha Omicron chapter is established on May 4, *1923. 
1924: James B. Duke creates an endowment for schools, hospitals, and retired and disabled ministers.  Four educational institutions are added to the endowment: Trinity College (now Duke University), Furman University, Davidson College, and Johnson C. smith University. 
1927: Kappa Alpha Psi fraternity is the third national Greek letter organization to be chartered. The Alpha Epsilon chapter is established on December 10, 1927. 
1927: The Alpha Epsilon chapter of Phi Beta Sigma fraternity is established late in 1927. 
1929: Jane Berry Smith dies. 
1931: Johnson C. Smith University holds its first Founders Day Celebration
1932: In 1932, the university's charter was amended, providing for the admission of women to the senior division. The 65-year-old institution for men then became partially coeducational. 
1933: Johnson C. Smith University is given an "A" rating by Southern Association of Schools and Colleges. 
1934: The university joins the American Council on Education as a full member. 
1940: The Duke Residence Hall for women is built and named in honor of James B. Duke. 
1941: Women were admitted to the freshman class. 
1942: Johnson C. Smith celebrates its Diamond Jubilee
1943: Dr. Hardy Liston takes over the Office of Executive Vice President. 
1944: The Gamma Lambda chapter of Delta Sigma Theta sorority is founded on February 19, 1944. 
1944: Alpha Kappa Alpha sorority charters the Gamma Delta chapter the last week in February 1944. 
1945: Johnson C. Smith University joins the United Negro College Fund as a founding member. 
1947: President Henry Lawrence McCrorey retires after forty years of service. Dr. Hardy Liston is elected president. 
1947: Carter Hall is renovated, with a new structure being erected within the existing hull of the building. 
1951: Dr. Henry Lawrence McCrorey dies July 13, 1951
1952: A revision of the university's charter is made that officially deletes reference to race. 
1955: In November 1955, the Henry Lawrence McCrorey Theological Hall was dedicated and provided a new home for the 88-year-old seminary and its library. 
1956: President Dr. Hardy Liston dies on October 20, 1956.  Dr. J. W. Seabrook steps in as Interim President. 
1957: Dr. Rufus Patterson Perry is elected as president in April of that year. 
1961: The new gymnasium is erected. 
1962: Hardy Liston Residence Hall is erected.  The building is dedicated later in April 1963. 
1965: The University Memorial Student Union is built. 
1966: The Reverend Dr. Martin Luther King Jr. speaks on campus as a part of the Centennial Celebration that began October 12, 1966. 
1967: The university holds the main Centennial Celebration on April 7, 1967, in the new gymnasium with the them of “New Dimensions in Higher Education”. 
1967: Three major construction projects are completed: The James B. Duke Memorial Library, Myers Hall (a dormitory for men), and Sanders Hall (a dormitory for women). 
1968: Dr. Rufus Patterson Perry resigns from his position as president. 
1968: The new science center is constructed. 
1969: Lionel H. Newsom becomes the ninth president of the university
1969: The Seminary moves to Atlanta Georgia and merges with the Interdenominational Theological Center. 
1972: The overpass connecting the two sides of the campus is erected over Beatties Ford road. 
1972: Dr. Wilbert Greenfield becomes the tenth President of Johnson C. Smith University
1976: The Mary Irwin Belk Early Childhood Education Center is erected. 
1983: Dr. Robert L. Albright becomes the eleventh President of the university. 
1985: Greenfield Hall is erected and named in honor of past President Dr. Wilbert Greenfield. 
1986: The Lionel H. Newsom Humanities Building is built. 
1990: The Robert L. Albright Honors College Center opens
1991: The Faculty Center opens
1993: The Edward E. Crutchfield Jr. Center for Integrated Studies is built
1994: The New Residence Hall opens
1994: Dr. Dorothy Cowser Yancy becomes the first woman and twelfth President of Johnson C. Smith University
1997: The Technology Center is built. 
2003: JCSU opens a new state-of-the-art academic and sports facility, the Irwin Belk Complex. 
2008: Dr. Ronald L. Carter becomes the thirteenth President. 
2018: Clarence D. Armbrister, J.D. becomes the fourteenth President of Johnson C. Smith University.

Academics

Johnson C. Smith University offers 24 different degrees to undergraduate students and one to postgraduates.  Each student earns his or her degree through one of three colleges:  the College of Arts and Letters, the College of STEM (Science, Technology, Engineering and Mathematics), or the College of Professional Studies.

The Robert L. Albright Honors College is available to qualified high-achieving undergraduate students at JCSU. The college is named after the 11th president of the university.

Metropolitan College offers undergraduate degree programs to adults to enhance their opportunities for career advancement and success.  Metropolitan College provides students with flexible, convenient schedules and a variety of course styles including on-campus and online courses, as well as a Flex-Option for courses that include both online and in-class instruction.  Evening courses at Metropolitan College are offered in criminology, social work, and business administration.

Colleges
The university is organized into three colleges:
College of Arts and Letters
College of Science, Technology, Engineering and Mathematics (STEM)
College of Professional Studies.

James B. Duke Memorial Library
The James B. Duke Memorial Library was built in 1967 in memory of James Buchanan Duke, a major benefactor to the university.   Carnegie Library, the existing library at that time, was not large enough to meet the expanding academic programming and increasing enrollment.   In 1998, the library completed a $7 million yearlong modernization and reconstruction to allow the building to serve as an information hub in a digital age.

The vibrant mural illustrates the founding of the university by the Reverends S. L. Alexander and W. L. Miller on April 7, 1867, the original two students, the outstanding contributors to the school, historic buildings, and the first seven presidents of the university. The mural features a portrait of Jane Berry Smith who donated several buildings to the university in the early 1920s and for whom the Board of Trustees renamed the school from Biddle University. Also featured is James Buchanan Duke, a prominent North Carolina business man, who established an endowment in 1924 that included the university and the man for whom the Library is named.

Student activities
Due to its location near downtown Charlotte, North Carolina, there are many social and cultural activities for JCSU students and faculty to enjoy, including professional sporting events, theater/movies, concerts, art exhibits, bands, chorale, poetry readings, and dance, among others.

Fraternities and sororities
All of the National Pan-Hellenic Council organizations currently have chapters at Johnson C. Smith University. These organizations are (in order of establishment):

Other organizations include:

Athletics

Student-athletes compete in intercollegiate and intramural athletics. JCSU is a member of the National Collegiate Athletic Association (NCAA), Division II and the Central Intercollegiate Athletic Association (CIAA). Its intercollegiate sports programs include basketball, bowling, cross-country, football, golf, softball, volleyball, tennis, and track and field. Its teams are nicknamed the Golden Bulls.

Notable alumni

Notable faculty
{| class="wikitable"
| style="width: 125pt;" | Name
| style="width: 150pt;" | Department
| style="width: 650pt;" | Notability
| style="width: 50pt;" | Reference(s)

Bibliography

References

External links

 
 Johnson C. Smith Athletics website

 
Private universities and colleges in North Carolina
Historically black universities and colleges in the United States
Universities and colleges in Charlotte, North Carolina
Universities and colleges accredited by the Southern Association of Colleges and Schools
Universities and colleges affiliated with the Presbyterian Church (USA)
Educational institutions established in 1867
University and college buildings on the National Register of Historic Places in North Carolina
Presbyterianism in North Carolina
Liberal arts colleges in North Carolina
National Register of Historic Places in Mecklenburg County, North Carolina
1867 establishments in North Carolina